Neo-Legionarism is a neo-fascist movement in Romania that emerged in the 1990s following the fall of communism in the country. It is endorsed by a series of organizations that claim to be the sucessors of the Iron Guard (whose followers were known as "Legionnaires") founded by Corneliu Zelea Codreanu in 1927. Its main characteristics include antisemitism, Eastern Orthodoxy, ethnic nationalism and mysticism.

Links between neo-Legionary organizations and priests of the Romanian Orthodox Church are a documented phenomenon in Romania. Neo-Legionarism has kept the "" movement active. In 2014, a monk at Petru Vodă Monastery in Neamț County delivered a pro-Iron Guard sermon, prompting the church hierarchy to condemn him. Earlier, a group of nuns had sung the Legionnaire tune Sfânta tinerețe legionară ("Holy Legionnaire Youth") for the birthday of prominent monk .

Noua Dreaptă ("New Right") and the Everything For the Country Party have been described as neo-Legionary. The latter was founded in 1993 and drew support from members of the original Iron Guard. The Alliance for the Union of Romanians has also been associated with this current, although its leaders have denied any such connection.

See also
 Neo-Nazism

References

Bibliography
 William Totok and Elena-Irina Macovei, Între mit și bagatelizare. Despre reconsiderarea critică a trecutului, Ion Gavrilă Ogoranu și rezistența armată anticomunistă din România. Bucharest: Editura Elefant Online, 2016, ISBN 978-973-466-206-7

Neo-fascism
Iron Guard
Far-right politics in Romania
Fascism in Romania
History of Romania (1989–present)
Eastern Orthodoxy and far-right politics
Antisemitism in Romania